Wonder is the first studio album by Australian singer Lisa Mitchell. It was released on 31 July 2009 in Australia by Scorpio Music. The album has yielded three singles; "Coin Laundry", "Clean White Love" and "Oh! Hark!".

Writing for the album began in 2007 where she collaborated with artists such as Ben Lee, Kevin Mitchell, Clare Bowditch and Katy Steele. At the end of 2007, she moved to London to continue writing for the album and collaborating with Ant Whiting, Ed Harcourt, Dann Hume and Sacha Skarbek. She returned to Australia in 2008 and re-recorded most of the album with Evermore member Dann Hume, stating their versions had more energy and were a lot lighter – "they were positive and uplifting." Mitchell explains, "With Anthony, I was homesick by the time I got around to doing the vocals."

Wonder had commercial success in Australia. It debuted at number six on the Australian ARIA Albums Chart on 10 August 2009, becoming Mitchell's first top ten album. The album spent three weeks in the top ten and twenty-four weeks in the top fifty, re-entering three times. The Australian Recording Industry Association awarded the album a platinum certification for shipping 70,000 copies and became the fifty-sixth highest selling album in Australia for 2009. Wonder was nominated for one ARIA Award at the twenty-third ARIA Awards in 2009 for "Breakthrough Artist – Album", but lost the award to Ladyhawke by Ladyhawke.

At the J Awards of 2009, the album was nominated for Australian Album of the Year.

Track listing

Charts

Weekly charts

Year-end charts

Release history

References

2009 debut albums
Lisa Mitchell albums
Albums produced by Ant Whiting